Al Bandiero  is an American film, radio personality, and television actor, known for playing Peter Evans in the television series Desire.

Other works
 Extensive TV Hosting; Children's Miracle Network Telethon, TV 2000, This Week's Music, Music Connection, also numerous infomercials.
 Extensive National Radio Shows; Al's Party, Incredible 80s, DJ at WKBW in the late 1970s and WKTU in 1980s.
 Direct Hits, Club Hotline (Japan)
 Extensive Voice over credits; Car companies, Hair shampoos, Soft drinks, Pop Albums, TV promos, etc.
 Silent Hill: Homecoming (video-game) 4 characters (mo-cap & voices)

Publicity
Interviews
 Southeastern Antiquing & Collecting Magazine (USA) January 2007, by: Ken Hall, "Al Bandiero, Star of the Fox TV Series Desire, Collects Watches"
 Radio & Records (USA) 28 July 2006, Iss. 1668, pg. 28, by: Darnella Dunham, "Going Hollywood, From Radio Personality to Actor"
 Starry Constellation Magazine (USA) 2006, by: Lisa Steinberg, "Al Bandiero, Desire"

Pictorial
 Fitness + (USA) October 2000, pg. 84-87, by: Steve Raimondi, "The man behind the voice"

Filmography
Desire (2006) (TV series) - Peter Evans (65 episodes)
The Confession (2005) - Prison Guard
I Am Stamos (2004) - Agent
The Practice (2003) (TV series) - Police Officer (1 episode)
Dragnet (2003) (TV series) - Reporter No. 1 (1 episode)
Mister Sterling (????) (TV series) - Maitre'D (1 episode)
Girls Behaving Badly (????) (TV series) - Mob Husband (1 episode)
Scene of the Crime (2002) (TV) - Det. Jimm Redmond
Rocky IV (1985) - American Commentator #2

External links

Official website

Male actors from New York City
American male film actors
American radio personalities
American male television actors
People from Brooklyn
Male actors from Los Angeles
American people of Italian descent
1963 births
Living people